The Purpose Driven Life is a bible study book written by Christian pastor Rick Warren and published by Zondervan in 2002. The book offers readers a 40-day personal spiritual journey and presents what Warren says are God's five purposes for human life on Earth.

Background
Warren was encouraged by Billy Graham in his 20s after he wrote his first book: Rick Warren’s Bible Study Methods. This greatly inspired Warren when he had "little confidence" in his writing ability:

The 2002 book Purpose Driven Life is a sequel to his 1995 book The Purpose Driven Church.

Overview 
The book is intended to be read as a daily inspiration, with each of the 40 short chapters read on consecutive days.  Each chapter contains a personal application section at the end with a "point to ponder," a verse to remember, and a question to consider over the course of that day. Rick Warren described his book as an "anti-self-help book."  The first sentence of the book reads, "It's not about you," and the remainder of the chapter goes on to explain how the quest for personal fulfillment, satisfaction, and meaning can only be found in understanding and doing what God placed you on Earth to do. The book's 40 chapters are divided into six major sections, with the following titles:
What on Earth Am I Here For?
Purpose #1: You Were Planned for God's Pleasure (Christian Worship)
Purpose #2: You Were Formed for God's Family (Christian Fellowship)
Purpose #3: You Were Created to Become Like Christ (Discipleship)
Purpose #4: You Were Shaped for Serving God (Christian Ministry)
Purpose #5: You Were Made for a Mission (Christian Mission)
In later versions of the book, 2 additional chapters were added about the 2 biggest reasons why Christians don't live purpose driven lives, envy and "people pleasing."

Reception

Sales

The book topped the Wall Street Journal best seller charts as well as Publishers Weekly charts. The Purpose Driven Life was also on the New York Times Bestseller List for over 90 weeks. It had sold over 18 million copies by 2008, and 32 million copies within its first decade, by 2012. According to both the author and publisher Simon & Schuster, 50 million copies had been sold in more than 85 languages by 2020.

Impact

A May 2005 survey of American pastors and ministers conducted by George Barna asked Christian leaders to identify what books were the most influential on their lives and ministries.  The Purpose Driven Life was the most frequent response. The Purpose Driven Church, written prior to The Purpose Driven Life, was the second most frequent response. Billy Graham described the book as one that would "guide you to greatness—through living the Great Commandment and the Great Commission of Jesus."

In 2005, after reading the book, the President of Rwanda, Paul Kagame, invited Warren to develop the P.E.A.C.E. Plan in the country.

Criticism

Biblical scholar Robert M. Price criticized Warren for applying eisegesis, which includes quoting various translations of the Bible and selectively choosing whichever paraphrase or translation supports his theses. Jason Harris criticized the book for providing the scripture citations only in end notes, making it harder for readers to know the context of the passages it cites.

Popular culture

NFL legend Ray Lewis gave the book to 23-time Olympic gold medalist Michael Phelps when he went to rehab. Phelps was deeply touched by the book. He read it while in rehab, even to other patients, earning him the nickname "Preacher Mike".

The book occupies an important place in the film Captive released in 2015.  This fact-based film tells the story of Ashley Smith, a young single mom of Atlanta, being held hostage by Brian Nichols, in her apartment for seven hours. Smith reported to news outlets that during this time she read chapter 32 of The Purpose Driven Life to Nichols, which she credited as influencing his decision to release her from captivity. In 2012, Smith also stated that she had been struggling with drug addiction at the time, and she gave Nichols drugs to calm him down. Smith had to decide whether to do the drugs with Nichols. Smith chose not to, and she hasn't touched drugs since. Sales of The Purpose Driven Life rose greatly, with the book becoming Amazon's second-best-selling book after news of Smith's captivity and release was announced.

See also 
 Biblical literalism
 Cafeteria Christianity
 Christian literature
 Saddleback Church

References

Bibliography
 

2002 books
Evangelical Christian literature
Books by Rick Warren
Self-help books
Zondervan books